Leaflove may refer to:

 Red-tailed leaflove, also known as African leaflove, common leaflove, leaflove and plain leaflove, a species of bird found in western and central Africa
 Uela leaflove and Gabon leaflove, subspecies
 Simple leaflove, alternate name for the simple greenbul, a species of bird found in western and central Africa
 Yellow-throated leaflove, a species of bird found in western and central Africa
 Congo white-throated leaflove, subspecies

 
Birds by common name